Azer may refer to the following people
Given name
Azer Aliyev (born 1994), Russian football midfielder
Azer Amiraslanov (born 1971), Azerbaijani economist
Azer Bušuladžić (born 1991), Bosnian-Danish footballer 
Azer Bülbül (1967– 2012), Azerbaijani folk singer and actor
Azer Mammadov (born 1976), Azerbaijani football defender
Azer Mirzoev (born 1978), Azerbaijani chess player
Azer Zeynalov (born 1964), Azerbaijani opera singer, film composer and actor

Surname
Gündüz Gürol Azer (born 1980), Turkish footballer 
Hani Azer (born 1948), Egyptian civil engineer
Samy Azer, Australian medical educator
 Gerges Azer, Anesthesia Resident in Cleveland Clinic Florida